Lipowiec-Kolonia  is a village in the administrative district of Gmina Szczebrzeszyn, within Zamość County, Lublin Voivodeship, in eastern Poland. Its population was 14 in 2011.

References

Lipowiec-Kolonia